Hidden Treasures Ruslan Miss Nepal 2017, the 22nd annual Miss Nepal beauty pageant, was held on 2 June 2017 at Hotel Annapurna in Kathmandu, the capital city of Nepal. Miss Nepal 2016 Asmi Shrestha crowned her successor Nikita Chandak as the new Miss Nepal World 2017 who represented Nepal in the Miss World 2017.

At the same event, Roshni Khatri crowned her successor Rojina Shrestha as Miss Earth Nepal 2017 and Barsha Lekhi crowned her successor Niti Shah as Miss International Nepal 2017. In addition to those 3 titles, this year Miss Nepal has brought back the original title of Miss Nepal Asia Pacific 2017 to its fourth winner, making a Top 4 winners.

The winner of Miss Nepal 2017 served as the brand ambassador of popular drink Fanta and WWF Nepal for a year. In addition, she received $1,000 as prize for winning the title. The auditions of Miss Nepal were held in Dharan, Birgunj, Chitwan, Nepalgunj, Pokhara, Butwal and Kathmandu.

NTV and NTV PLUS broadcast the pageant live and for the Nepalese abroad. Miss Nepal 2017 was live streamed on M&S V Magazine's official website.

Results

Color keys

(●): The candidate won the Miss Popular Choice Award (online voting) and got direct entry into Top 14 semi-Finalists.

Sub-titles

Contestants

 Niti Shah is the 1st runner up of Face of House of Fashion Season 1.
 Narmata Gurung is the winner of Hunt for Supermodel Season 2 (2016) which was organized in Hong Kong.

Previous Experience
 (#1) Eksha Maden was 2nd runner up in Miss Purwanchal 2016 regional pageant which gave her the direct entry to Miss Nepal 2017 Top 20 contestants.
 (#2) Sadikshya Pandey is the winner of Miss Pokhara 2016 regional pageant giving her a sport in Nepal 2017 Top 20 contestants.

 (#3) Suman Gurung is the winner of Miss Chitwan 2017 regional pageant which gave her the direct entry to Miss Nepal 2017 Top 20 contestants.

References

External links
Miss Nepal Website
Miss Nepal Official Website

Beauty pageants in Nepal
2017 beauty pageants
Miss Nepal
2017 in Nepal